Myittha is a town in Myittha Township, Kyaukse District, Mandalay Region, central Myanmar.

See also
 Myittha River

External links
Satellite map at Maplandia.com

Township capitals of Myanmar
Populated places in Mandalay Region